Molinos Río de la Plata (BCBA: MOLI) is Argentina's largest branded food products company. The company is a large exporter of sunflower processed oil and is one of Argentina's main exporters of bottled oil. Molinos also produces a wide range of packaged foods for domestic consumption, including bottled oil, margarine, pasta, pre-mixes, packaged flours, yerba mate, rice, cold cuts, and frozen foods.

Overview

Molinos Río de la Plata (Molinos) originated with the 1899 establishment of Centenera, a food processing plant, by Bunge y Born, then a prominent local wheat milling company established by Belgian immigrants in 1884. They had one of the largest wheat mills in the country built on a Puerto Madero lot in 1902, and with it, established Molinos Río de la Plata (later a leader in the local retail foods market).

Bunge & Born divested itself of almost all its retail foods interests in 1998, however, and was reorganized as Bunge Limited, upon which a controlling stake in Molinos was sold to Gregorio Pérez Companc.

On August 1, 2002, Molinos announced the partial repurchase of its US$150 million senior secured export notes (SENs), due 2006. Molinos repurchased US$31.4 million face value of the notes at a 25% discount, using available cash balances. Following the repurchase, the amount outstanding on the SENs is US$52.6 million.

The transaction has improved Molinos' financial profile by reducing the debt burden and lowering debt servicing costs. Molinos remains current on its scheduled debt payments. Notwithstanding, Molinos' credit risk remains high due to the negative financial ramifications of the peso's devaluation and the adverse economic environment in the country. On a pro forma basis at June 30, 2002, after accounting for the repurchase, Molinos' total consolidated financial debt reached Arg$718.8 million (approximately US$188 million), composed mainly of a balance outstanding on its SENs of US$52.6 million and US$84 million in working capital finance, most of it dollar denominated.

Molinos operates 20 manufacturing plants, 10 distribution centers, and 600 trucks, among other facilities. It owns 75,000 hectares (188,000 acres) of prime Pampas land for the production of wheat.

Notes

m
Food manufacturers of Argentina|m
m
m
m